The Württenberg Fz was a class of nine 2-6-0T rack locomotives of the Royal Württemberg State Railways (Königlich Württembergische Staats-Eisenbahnen, K.W.St.E.). Seven of the Riggenbach rack system locomotives (Nos. 591 to 596 and 599) were taken over by Deutsche Reichsbahn and were placed in class (Baureihe) 97.3 in their 1925 renumbering plan. 

The first four locomotives were named ACHALM, GRAFENECK, LICHTENSTEIN and MÜNSINGEN and were used on the Honau–Lichtenstein rack railway line. In contrast to the first four, these vehicles had a connecting pipe between the two steam domes.

The boiler and running gear were derived from the  Württemberg F.

The locomotives had rack gears on the first and second axles, which were driven by a small gear in between. The small gear itself was driven by the inner two cylinders of the four-cylinder steam engine. The locomotives could be operated either as a compound, or as a four-cylinder simple. The valve gear and rack system drive were so complex and prone to failure that the locomotives were withdrawn and scrapped by the Deutsche Reichsbahn by 1930. The boiler also did not meet the requirements. The rack drive had to be kept engaged almost continuously when driving up the mountain, since the steam was used up too quickly, and stop had to be made for a 'breather' or 'blow up'.

References 

  (ANNO (Austrian Newspapers Online))
 

 

2-6-0T locomotives
Fz
Esslingen locomotives
Rack and cog driven locomotives
Standard gauge steam locomotives
Standard gauge locomotives of Germany
Railway locomotives introduced in 1893
Passenger locomotives